Riders of Pasco Basin is a 1940 American Western film directed by Ray Taylor and written by Ford Beebe. The film stars Johnny Mack Brown, Bob Baker, Fuzzy Knight, Frances Robinson, Arthur Loft and Ted Adams. The film was released on April 5, 1940, by Universal Pictures.

Plot

Cast        
Johnny Mack Brown as Lee Jamison
Bob Baker as Bruce Moore
Fuzzy Knight as Luther
Frances Robinson as Jean Madison
Arthur Loft as Matthew Kirby
Ted Adams as Magee
Frank LaRue as Joel Madison
William Gould as Caleb Scott
James Guilfoyle as John Evans
Ed Cassidy as Sheriff Ed Marlowe
Lafe McKee as Uncle Dan
Robert Winkler as Tommy Scott
Chuck Morrison as Johnson
Rudy Sooter as himself

References

External links
 

1940 films
American Western (genre) films
1940 Western (genre) films
Universal Pictures films
Films directed by Ray Taylor
American black-and-white films
1940s English-language films
1940s American films